Adlai Ewing Stevenson III (October 10, 1930 – September 6, 2021) was an American attorney and politician of the Democratic Party who represented Illinois in the United States Senate from 1970 until 1981. A member of the prominent Stevenson family, he also served as a member of the Illinois House of Representatives and Illinois Treasurer. He unsuccessfully ran for governor of Illinois in 1982 and 1986. He had been awarded Japan’s Order of the Sacred Treasure with gold and silver stars and was an honorary Professor of Renmin University, China.

Early life, education, and early career (1930–1964)
Adlai Stevenson III was born in Chicago, the son of Ellen Borden and two time Democratic Party presidential nominee Adlai Stevenson II. He attended Milton Academy in Massachusetts, Harrow School in England, and Harvard College. He received a law degree in 1957 from Harvard Law School. Stevenson was commissioned as a lieutenant in the U.S. Marine Corps in 1952, served in Korea and was discharged from active duty in 1954. He continued to serve in the Marine Reserves and was discharged in 1961 as a captain. In 1957, Stevenson went to work as a clerk for a Justice of the Illinois Supreme Court and worked there until 1958 when he joined the law firm of Brown and Platt.

Early political career (1964–1970)

State politics

Illinois House of Representatives 
In 1964, Stevenson was elected to the Illinois House of Representatives as an at-large representative due to reapportionment problems, serving from 1965 to 1967. During his time in the state house, he won a Best Legislator award from the Independent Voters of Illinois.

Treasurer of Illinois 
In 1969, he was elected treasurer of Illinois. As state treasurer, he quadrupled earnings on the investment of State funds while cutting the budget each year.

United States Senate (1970–1981)

Elections

1970 
Following the death of incumbent U.S. Senator Everett Dirksen, who died in 1969, Stevenson ran for his seat. He faced former state representative Ralph Tyler Smith in the general election, who was appointed to the seat by governor Richard B. Ogilvie. Stevenson defeated Smith in a 1970 special election by a 58% to 42% margin to fill Dirksen's unexpired term.

1974 
In 1974, Stevenson ran for re-election, and faced Republican George Burditt in the general election. He defeated Burditt by  a large margin of nearly 800,000 votes.

Committee assignments 
In the Senate, Stevenson served on the Commerce Committee (Chairman of the Subcommittee on Science, Technology and Space), Banking Committee (Chairman of the Subcommittee on International Finance) and Intelligence Committee (Chairman, Subcommittee on the Collection and Production of Intelligence). He was the first Chairman of the Senate Ethics Committee charged with implementing a code of ethics he helped draft. Stevenson was also chairman of a Special Senate Committee which led the first major reorganization of the Senate since its Committee system was formed in the early 19th Century.

Tenure 
Stevenson was sworn in as senator on November 17, 1970.

Vietnam War 
Stevenson opposed the Vietnam War. He condemned Democratic President Lyndon B. Johnson’s Indochina policies and the violent police tactics at the Democratic National Convention in Chicago in 1968, renewed his attacks on Republican President Richard M. Nixon’s prosecution of the war. He also introduced legislation requiring an end to all foreign aid to South Vietnam by June 30, 1975.

Watergate scandal 
Stevenson was highly critical of Republican President Richard M. Nixon during the Watergate scandal. He called on Nixon to answer for the integrity of the country’s leaders. “All of us — Republicans and Democrats — have an interest in clearing the record,” he said a year before Nixon resigned in disgrace. “The faith of the people in their system and their leaders — a faith that has already been shaken enough — is at stake.”

Legislative accomplishments 
Stevenson authored the International Banking Act of 1978, the Stevenson-Wydler Technology Innovation Act of 1980 and its companion, the Bayh–Dole Act, to foster cooperative research, organize national laboratories for technology utilization and commercialization, and permit private sector interests in government-funded research. He was the first chairman of the United States Senate Select Committee on Ethics charged with implementing a code of ethics he helped draft. Stevenson was also chairman of a special Senate committee that reorganized the Senate and served on the United States Senate Democratic Policy Committee. He also conducted the first in-depth congressional study of terrorism as chairman of the Subcommittee on the Collection and Production of Intelligence, leading to introduction of the Comprehensive Counter Terrorism Act of 1971. He warned of "spectacular acts of disruption and destruction" and an amendment that proposed reducing assistance for Israel by $200 million. His amendment received seven votes.

1976 Presidential election

Presidential bid 
Stevenson was encouraged to run for president in 1976, which was fueled by Richard J. Daley of Chicago, who resented the senator’s liberal reforms but who knew a vote-getter when he saw one. The senator declined to campaign, but as the nominating process got underway, Daley forces ran him as a favorite son candidate.

Vice presidential finalist 
Despite this, former Gov. Jimmy Carter of Georgia locked up the nomination before the 1976 Democratic National Convention, in New York. He was, however, one of the finalists for vice president at the convention, though Carter eventually chose U.S. Senator Walter Mondale from Minnesota.

Retirement 
Stevenson opted to not run for reelection in 1980 and returned to Illinois to practice law.

Post-Senate life and career (1981–2021)

Gubernatorial bids 
Stevenson ran for governor of Illinois in 1982 and 1986, losing both elections to James R. Thompson.

1982 
In the 1982 campaign, Stevenson complained that Thompson was trying to portray him as an ineffectual elitist by famously stating, "He is saying 'Me tough guy,' as if to imply that I’m some kind of wimp." The initial vote count showed Stevenson winning; however, the final official count showed him losing by 0.14 percent. Stevenson promptly petitioned the Illinois Supreme Court for a recount and presented evidence of widespread election irregularities, including evidence of a failed punch card system for tabulation of votes. Three days before the gubernatorial inauguration, the court denied the recount by a one-vote margin, asserting that the Illinois recount statute was unconstitutional.

1986 
In the 1986 statewide Democratic primaries, Democratic voters nominated allies of Lyndon LaRouche for lieutenant governor and secretary of state. Stevenson objected to their platform and refused to appear on the same ticket. Instead, he organized the Illinois Solidarity Party to provide an alternate slate for governor, lieutenant governor, and secretary of state, which was endorsed by Democratic Party of Illinois. Persuading Democrats to vote for most of the Democratic ticket as well as the Solidarity candidates for governor, lieutenant governor, and secretary of state was an unconventional strategy; however, Stevenson and the candidate for lieutenant governor position, Mike Howlett, won 40% of the vote.

Later career

Business and cultural relations 
After leaving the Senate, Stevenson was active in business and cultural relations with East Asia. He was chairman of SC&M Investment Management Corporation, and co-chairman of HuaMei Capital Company (the first Chinese-American investment bank).

Non-profit organizations 
He also held many positions with non-profit organizations in this area. He served as chairman of the Japan-America Society of Chicago, the Midwest U.S.-Japan Association, and the Midwest U.S.-China Association, and as president of the U.S. Committee of the Pacific Economic Cooperation Council (PECC). He was also co-chairman of the PECC's Financial Market Development Project, a member of the U.S.-Korea Wisemen Council, and sat on the board of directors of the Korea Institute for International Economic Policy. He was also chairman of the international Adlai Stevenson Center on Democracy housed at the family home, a national historic landmark, near Libertyville, Illinois. Stevenson was also a member of the ReFormers Caucus of Issue One.

UNPA proposal 
On December 8, 2012, aged 82, Stevenson endorsed the proposal for the United Nations Parliamentary Assembly (UNPA), one of only six persons who served in the United States Congress ever to do so.

Death 
Stevenson died from complications of Lewy body disease at his home in Chicago on September 6, 2021, at age 90. At the time of his death, he also had dementia.

Personal life

Family 

Stevenson's great-grandfather Adlai E. Stevenson I was Vice President of the United States (1893–1897) during Grover Cleveland's second term. His grandfather Lewis Stevenson was Illinois secretary of state (1914–1917). His father, Adlai Stevenson II, was governor of Illinois, Ambassador to the United Nations, and two-time Democratic presidential nominee. Actor McLean Stevenson was his third cousin. Adlai III is also more distant cousins with actor Parker Stevenson and author Robert Louis Stevenson.

Marriage and children 
Stevenson met his future wife, Nancy Anderson, in 1953 while he was in tank training at Fort Knox, Kentucky in preparation for his deployment to Japan and then Korea. The couple was married in 1955 at Nancy’s home outside of Louisville. Together, they had four children. His son Adlai Stevenson IV is a business executive and former journalist. Though Adlai IV had previously expressed his intention to be "Adlai the last," his son, Adlai Ewing Stevenson V, was born in the summer of 1994.

In addition to Adlai IV, he is survived by another son, Warwick; as well as two daughters, Lucy and Katherine; his brothers; and at least nine grandchildren.

Writings

 Stevenson authored The Black Book, which records American history and culture from within its politics as his family knew it over five generations, starting with his great great grandfather, Jesse W. Fell, who was Abraham Lincoln's patron and persuaded him to run for president. As well as his grandfather Lewis Stevenson, an Illinois secretary of state, who unsuccessfully sought the Democratic vice-presidential nomination in 1928.

Awards
Stevenson has been honored with a number of awards, which include :

 Order of the Sacred Treasure, by the government of Japan, with gold and silver star.
 Honorary Professor of Renmin University in China.
 Laureate of the Lincoln Academy of Illinois
 Order of Lincoln by the governor of Illinois in 1981 in the area of government.

References

Further reading

External links

Political Science: Analysis of the 1986 election "debacle" in Illinois

|-

|-

|-

1930 births
2021 deaths
20th-century American lawyers
20th-century American politicians
American Unitarian Universalists
American people of Scotch-Irish descent
Candidates in the 1976 United States presidential election
Candidates in the 1982 United States elections
Candidates in the 1986 United States elections
Deaths from Lewy body dementia
Democratic Party United States senators from Illinois
Harvard College alumni
Harvard Law School alumni
Illinois lawyers
Democratic Party members of the Illinois House of Representatives
Military personnel from Illinois
Milton Academy alumni
Deaths from dementia in Illinois
People educated at Harrow School
State treasurers of Illinois
Stevenson family
United States Marine Corps officers
People associated with Mayer Brown